Alan Beer (born 11 March 1950) is a Welsh-born former footballer who played as a forward in the Football League during the 1970s, most notably with Exeter City.

He started his career with home-town's West End F.C., before progressing to play for Swansea's senior team Swansea City. After 15 league appearances he moved into non-league football with Weymouth F.C. but returned to the Football League with Exeter City in 1974/75.

He made over 100 league appearances for Exeter, and was part of the team that were promoted from Football League Division Four in 1976–77, including scoring two goals in an amazing 4–3 win at Barnsley, in which Exeter had trailed 3–0 at half time.

Following his retirement from football, he worked in a car dealership.

References 

Welsh footballers
English Football League players
West End F.C. players
Swansea City A.F.C. players
Weymouth F.C. players
Exeter City F.C. players
Footballers from Swansea
Living people
1950 births
Wales amateur international footballers
Association football forwards